Batrina   is a village in Slavonia region of Croatia. The settlement is administered as a part of Nova Kapela municipality, Brod-Posavina County. According to the 2001 census, the village has 1005 inhabitants. It is connected by the D49 state road.

See also
Nova Kapela–Batrina railway station

Sources

Populated places in Brod-Posavina County